Wonderland is the ninth studio album by Canadian singer-songwriter Sarah McLachlan, released on October 21, 2016 by Verve Records. It is McLachlan's second Christmas studio album, after 2006's Wintersong. The album received a nomination for Best Traditional Pop Vocal Album at the 60th Annual Grammy Awards.

Content 
Wonderland includes eleven Christmas songs recorded by McLachlan in 2016. The Barnes & Noble edition features two bonus tracks.

Track listing

Charts

Certifications and sales

Release history

See also
Wintersong
The Classic Christmas Album

References

2016 Christmas albums
Albums produced by Pierre Marchand
Christmas albums by Canadian artists
Pop Christmas albums
Verve Records albums
Juno Award for Adult Contemporary Album of the Year albums
Traditional pop albums